Yuyuantan Dongmen (Yuyuantan Park East Gate) station is a station on Line 16 of the Beijing Subway. It is located near the East Gate of Yuyuantan Park. The station opened on 31 December 2021. It was the southern terminus of Line 16 before the southern extension to  opened on 31 December 2022.

Station Layout 
The station has an underground island platform. There are 3 exits, lettered B, C and D. Exit B is accessible via an elevator.

See also 
Yuyuantan Park

References 

Beijing Subway stations in Haidian District
Beijing Subway stations in Xicheng District